The 2020 season was Kelantan's 75th year in their history and second season in the Malaysia Premier League since 2019 following relegation 2018 season. Along with the league, the club also participated in the Malaysia FA Cup and the Malaysia Cup.

Events
On 22 February 2020, the club launched their Jerseys and kits.

On 2 March 2020, the club has announced that Christopher Jackson injured and unable to play anytime soon. Lazarus Kaimbi joined the club from Sri Pahang.

On 13 July 2020, Kang Seung-jo left the club for K2 League club Gyeongnam.

On 15 August 2020, the club launched new jerseys after former main sponsor After Image withdrew their sponsorship. Stechmad Sdn Bhd became club's new main sponsor afterwards.

On 3 September 2020, Norizam Tukiman completed his purchased of the club from Kelantan Football Association for a reported RM6.8 million.

On 29 September 2020, the club has been officially approved for the privatization by Football Association of Malaysia.

On 3 October 2020, Kelantan draw 2-2 over Negeri Sembilan in league match.

On 8 December 2020, five players have confirmed to leave the club.

Players

First-team squad

Competitions

Malaysia Premier League

League table

Matches

Malaysia Cup

Statistics

Appearances and goals

|-
! colspan="10" style="background:#dcdcdc; text-align:center"| Goalkeepers

|-
! colspan="16" style="background:#dcdcdc; text-align:center"| Defenders

|-
! colspan="16" style="background:#dcdcdc; text-align:center"| Midfielders

|-
! colspan="16" style="background:#dcdcdc; text-align:center"| Forwards

|-
! colspan="16" style="background:#dcdcdc; text-align:center"| Players transferred out during the season

|-

References

2020
2020
Kelantan
Kelantan F.C.